Percy Miller (January 28, 1897 – January 14, 1958), nicknamed "Dimps", was an American Negro league pitcher and manager in the 1920s and 1930s.

A native of Omaha, Nebraska, Miller made his Negro leagues debut in 1921 with the Chicago Giants. He went on to enjoy a long career with several teams, and finished his career as player-manager of the Detroit Stars in 1937. Miller died in Philadelphia, Pennsylvania in 1958 at age 60.

References

External links
 and Baseball-Reference Black Baseball stats and Seamheads

1897 births
1958 deaths
Chicago Giants players
Cleveland Cubs players
Cleveland Elites players
Cleveland Hornets players
Detroit Stars (1937) players
Kansas City Monarchs players
Nashville Elite Giants players
Negro league baseball managers
Newark Browns players
St. Louis Giants (1924) players
St. Louis Stars (baseball) players
Baseball pitchers
Sportspeople from Omaha, Nebraska
Baseball players from Nebraska
20th-century African-American sportspeople